Marcel Albers (April 29, 1967 – April 20, 1992) was a Dutch motor racing driver.

Having progressed through the ranks of the Dutch formulae, including a Formula Ford championship win in 1989, Albers moved to the Opel Euroseries for 1990, going on to finish a creditable sixth in the championship. A move to British Formula Three for 1991 followed and again impressed, finishing fifth in the championship. He also finished third at the prestigious Marlboro Masters, finishing behind Scotsman David Coulthard and Spain's Jordi Gené. These performances had installed Albers to be one of the title favourites for the 1992 British championship. After a win in the opening round at Donington Park, Marcel retired from the second round at Silverstone and then qualified on the front row for round three.

Marcel was killed in April 1992 at Thruxton in Hampshire, during round 3 of the 1992 British Formula Three season. Having recovered from earlier gearbox troubles, he was running behind his team-mate Elton Julian on Woodham Hill, just before the braking area to the Club chicane, when he hit the back of Julian's car. His Ralt cartwheeled across the track, and smashed into the safety fencing, where he lay stricken in his car for an hour. Having been extracted from his car, he died on the way to the medical centre. He posthumously finished 7th in the race (which had been stopped after the accident) and 11th in the championship.

He has no relation to fellow Dutch motor racing driver Christijan Albers.

References

External links 
 
 Photo: Albers' car after hitting Julian

1967 births
1992 deaths
Racing drivers who died while racing
Dutch racing drivers
Sport deaths in England
EFDA Nations Cup drivers

Alan Docking Racing drivers
British Formula Three Championship drivers